Alec Douglas Howie (3 September 1913 − 22 May 1940) was a first-class cricketer who made one appearance for the Indian army cricket team. He died during the Second World War in the Battle of Belgium in 1940.

Early life
Alec Douglas Howie was born on 3 September 1913 in Saharanpur, Uttar Pradesh, British India. He was the son of Charles Thomas and Ethel Muriel Howie.

Cricket career
Howie appeared in one match for the Indian Army cricket team against Northern India in the Ranji Trophy. The match was played on 4 December 1934 at Lawrence Gardens, Lahore. Howie batted 49 runs during the match, and also bowled 3 over, taking no wickets. Northern India won the match by an inning and 52 runs.

Military career and death
Howie enlisted in the 1st Battalion, East Surrey Regiment as soon as he finished his education. In 1940, the battalion was sent to France with the British Expeditionary Force. In May of the same year, the battalion advanced into Belgium to stop the German invasion, but were pushed back to a defensive line at the Escaut river. Serving as a corporal during the Battle of the Escaut, Howie was killed in action on 22 May 1940. The battalion was forced back from the Escaut to the Dunkirk beachhead soon after, and was evacuated to England. Howie is buried at Heverlee War Cemetery.

References

External links

CWGC entry

1913 births
1940 deaths
People from Saharanpur
English cricketers
Indian Army cricketers
East Surrey Regiment soldiers
British Army personnel killed in World War II
Burials at Heverlee Commonwealth War Graves Commission Cemetery
Military personnel of British India